Bianchetti is an Italian surname. Notable people with the surname include:

Davide Bianchetti (born 1977), Italian squash player
Fabio Bianchetti, Italian figure skating official
Matteo Bianchetti (born 1993), Italian footballer
Sebastiano Bianchetti (born 1996), Italian shot putter
Suzanne Bianchetti (1889–1936), French actress

Italian-language surnames